The Pegu kukri snake (Oligodon cruentatus) is a species of snake of the family Colubridae. It is endemic to Myanmar.

Geographic range
The snake is found in Myanmar between 16° and 24° north.

References 

cruentatus
Snakes of Asia
Reptiles of Myanmar
Endemic fauna of Myanmar
Taxa named by Albert Günther
Reptiles described in 1868